Mick McGrath may refer to:

 Mick McGrath (footballer) (born 1936), Irish former footballer
 Mick McGrath (athlete) (born 1947), Australian former triple jumper
 Mick McGrath (rugby union) (born 1991), Irish rugby player